Lesiëm is a German musical project created in 1999 by the producers Sven Meisel and Alex Wende and active until 2005. The project's music combines elements of rock, pop, electronica, new age, enigmatic and ambient music, as well as Gregorian chant and other choral music. It is frequently compared to French project Era, German musical project Enigma and the Norwegian artist Amethystium. Lesiëm's website makes extensive reference to the group's mystical and spiritual influences.

Lesiëm released its debut album, Mystic Spirit Voices, in 2000. When the album was released in the United States in 2002, it climbed to no. 10 at the U.S. New Age Albums Billboard chart. Lesiëm's second album, Chapter 2, was released in 2001 in Europe, and in the United States in 2003 under the title Illumination, where it reached no. 7. at the New Age Albums Billboard chart.

The first two albums were some sort of prelude for the pop-opera Times, which was Lesiëm's third album (released as Auracle in the United States in 2004). The musicians started their work in March 2002 and finished it in the end of July. The single "Caritas" (featuring Scottish singer Maggie Reilly and Deutsche Oper Berlin) was presented in December 2002 on the philanthropic TV-show of José Carreras, Carreras Gala. In 2005, Lesiëm released its latest songs for a new version of Times, "Morgain" and "Morgause", both also collaborations with Maggie Reilly.

History

Lesiëm was created in Germany by producers Sven Meisel and Alex Wende in 1999 as an eclectic combination of Gregorian chants and choral music with modern genres and soundscapes, especially rock, pop and electronic music. The lyrics in Latin are written by Thomas Pflanz and sung by the all-male Carl Maria von Weber choir in the first two albums and the Deutsche Oper Berlin in the third.

Its first album, Mystic Spirit Voices, was released in January 2000 in Germany and 2002 in the United States, where it reached the number 10 at the Billboard New Age Albums chart.

Lesiëm's second album, Chapter 2, was released in 2001 in Germany and 2003 in the United States under the title "Illumination", ranking at number 7 at the Billboard New Age albums chart. It presented strong ethnic influences with its use of instruments like the duduk, the bagpipe and a second collaboration with South-African singer Lawrence Sihlabeni (following Indalo from the first album) in the track Africa.

Times, Lesiëm's latest work, was released in 2003 in Germany (with a reissue in 2005 featuring two new songs, Morgain and Morgause) and 2004 in the United States under the title "Auracle". It is the only album to feature a mixed-gender choir.

Discography

Albums
 Mystic Spirit Voices, Monopol Records, January 31, 2000 (US-release: Mystic. Spirit. Voices; Intentcity Records, 2002)
 "Lesiem"	(5:05)	- Wende, A. / Westland, H. / Pflanz, T.
 "Occultum" 	(3:50)	- Wende, Alex / Pflanz, Thomas
 "Fundamentum" 	(4:46)	- Wende, Alex / Pflanz, Thomas
 "Vivere" 	(4:02)	- Wende, Alex / Pflanz, Thomas
 "Open Your Eyes"	(4:12)	- Wende, A. / Pflanz, T. / Beyers, B.
 "Indalo" 	(3:54)	- Wende, Alex / Pflanz, T. / Sihlabeni, L.
 "Liberta" 	(4:26)	- Wende, Alex / Planz, T. / Härtl, M.
 "Miracle Eyes" 	(4:02)	- Westland, Henning / Pflanz, T. / Pabst, D.
 "Una Terra" 	(4:12)	- Westland, Henning / Pflanz, Thomas
 "Mater Gloria" 	(3:52)	- Wende, Alex / Pflanz, Thomas
 "Veni Creator Spiritus" 	(4:46)	- Härtl, Matthias
 "Lacrimosa" 	(4:34)	- Härtl, Matthias
 "Floreat" 	(5:08)	- Westland, Henning / Pflanz, T. / Arison, M.
 "In Taberna Mori" 	(4:00)	- Härtl, Matthias
 "Ave Fortuna" 	(5:08)	- Wende, Alex / Pflanz, Thomas
 "Liberta" (Choir version) 	(4:27)	- Wende, Alex / Planz, T. / Härtl, M.
 Chapter 2, Monopol Records, Koch, April 12, 2001 (US-release: Illumination; Intentcity Records, 2003) 
 "Agnus Dei" (00:53)
 "Pater Patriae" (04:07)
 "Navigator" (03:48)
 "Africa" (04:08)
 "Roma" (04:07)
 "Diva" (03:58)
 "Aureus" (04:07)
 "Coloris" (03:28)
 "Paradisus" (03:27)
 "Poeta" (04:39)
 "La Rose" (05:08)
 "Britannia" (03:58)
 "Agnus Dei" (00:38)
 Times, Monopol Records, Epic/Sony, April 4, 2003 (US-release: Auracle; Intentcity Records, April 28, 2004)
 "Humilitas"   (4:05)
 "Temperantia"   (4:01)
 "Caritas"   (4:23)
 "Fides"   (5:25)
 "Justitia"   (4:21)
 "Patientia"   (4:17)
 "Spes"   (3:49)
 "Prudentia"   (4:47)
 "Times"   (4:24)
 "Invidia"   (4:00)
 "Vanitas"   (4:41)
 "Fortitudo"   (4:33)
 "Bonitas"   (5:53)

Singles
 Fundamentum, Monopol Records, January 10, 2000
 Indalo, Monopol Records, June 5, 2000
 Liberta, Monopol Records, 2000;
 Africa, Monopol Records, March 21, 2000
 Navigator, Monopol Records, 2001;
 Caritas, Epic/Sony, December 16, 2002

Audiobooks
 Der steinige Weg, Monopol Records, October 21, 2005

See also
 Era
 E Nomine
 Enigma
 Gregorian
 Amethystium

References

New-age music groups